Francisco José Olivas Alba (born 21 August 1988), known as Kiko, is a Spanish professional footballer who plays as a central defender for FC Cartagena.

Club career
Born in Antequera, Province of Málaga, Kiko finished his youth career at local giants Málaga CF, and appeared five times for the first team in the 2006–07 season, whilst the Andalusians were in the Segunda División. In the following summer he signed with Villarreal CF, being one of the reserves' most important defensive members as they reached, for the first time, the country's second tier.

On 30 August 2009, Kiko made his debut for the first team, playing 90 minutes in a 1–1 La Liga draw at CA Osasuna. In his second match, already in 2010, he was sent off after a late tackle on Valencia CF's David Villa – a penalty was also awarded, with the same player scoring – in a 4–1 away defeat.

After being deemed surplus to requirements at Villarreal, Olivas left and signed a two-year deal with division two club Córdoba CF on 3 August 2012. He remained in that league the following years, representing CE Sabadell FC, Girona FC, Real Valladolid and FC Cartagena, achieving top-flight promotion with Girona and Valladolid.

References

External links

1988 births
Living people
People from Antequera
Sportspeople from the Province of Málaga
Spanish footballers
Footballers from Andalusia
Association football defenders
La Liga players
Segunda División players
Segunda División B players
Atlético Malagueño players
Málaga CF players
Villarreal CF B players
Villarreal CF players
Córdoba CF players
CE Sabadell FC footballers
Girona FC players
Real Valladolid players
FC Cartagena footballers
Spain under-21 international footballers